Dhamthal is a village in Tesil Zafarwal, Narowal District, Punjab, Pakistan. It is situated on the main road for Lahore. The facilities in the village including government high schools for boys and girls. There is a post office and mini telephone exchange . Dhamthal is the main market for this area because of its location. The village was the site of inter-ethnic violence in 1947..It is one of the biggest Trade market for crops in Narowal.

References

Villages in Narowal District